Miltochrista decussata is a moth of the family Erebidae. It was described by Frederic Moore in 1877. It is found in eastern China.

References

decussata
Moths described in 1877
Moths of Asia